Fderîck is a department of Tiris Zemmour Region in Mauritania.

References 

Departments of Mauritania